Waterford Cathedral may refer to two cathedrals in Ireland:
Christ Church Cathedral, Waterford, a Church of Ireland cathedral
Cathedral of the Most Holy Trinity, Waterford, a Roman Catholic Church cathedral

See also
Diocese of Cashel and Ossory in the Church of Ireland
Roman Catholic Diocese of Waterford and Lismore